The relationship between Algeria and Mauritania is often characterized as friendly, although there were several political standoffs between the two countries in the past.  such as the Western Sahara War (1975-1991). During the War, Mauritania and Morocco together invaded the Western Sahara region, while Algeria opposed them and supported the Polisario Front. Nonetheless, weaker and poorer than Algeria in every aspect, Mauritania ceded its claims and restored ties with Algeria.

Algeria has an embassy in Nouakchott while Mauritania has an embassy in Algiers.

Mauritanian Independence 
Algeria supported Mauritania in the 1960s against Moroccan territorial claims, and in the early 1970s helped it leave the franc-zone and establish a national currency. Algeria also gave technical, cultural, and economic aid. Good relations ended in 1974 in clear alliance of Mauritanian interests with Morocco. Mauritania broke relations over Algerian recognition of the SDAR.

Western Sahara War
The Polisario Front, supported by Algeria, fought a war against Mauritania and Morocco. The Mauritanian military, weaker in both materials and arms, was forced to renounce their claims in the Western Sahara. As for the result, Algeria and Mauritania re-invigorated their ties and became strategic partners.

Current relations
Both countries have been aiming to work and collaborate while trying not to anger Morocco, who is Algeria's fierce rival but Mauritania's important economic investor. Algeria is expanding their investments to Mauritania to counter Moroccan influence. Morocco has expressed their concerns over the ties between two nations.

In 2019, Algerian exports to Mauritania amounted to 1.4% of Mauritanian imports.

On 8 April 2021, the SAN Express «Sète-Algiers-Nouakchott» regular shipping line between the French port of Sète and the capital cities of Algiers and Nouakchott was opened, supervised by the Algerian company «AnisFer Line». The total rotation time is 20 days.

References

External links
Embassy of the People's Democratic Republic of Algeria in Mauritania 

 
Mauritania
Bilateral relations of Mauritania